Chengdu a sub-provincial city, the most populated prefectural-level division of China and it is divided into 9 districts, 4 county-level cities, and 6 counties. Chengdu is further divided into 123 township-level divisions.

County-level divisions

Other management zones 
 Tianfu New Area
 Chengdu Economic and Technological Development Zone
 Chengdu Hi-tech Industrial Development Zone
 Chengdu Tianfu Software Park
 Chengdu Export Processing Zone

Township-level divisions

Historical divisions

ROC (1911-1949)

References

Chengdu
Geography of Chengdu